"Soldiers" is a pop song released in 2012 by Swedish singer songwriter Ulrik Munther. He took part in Melodifestivalen 2012 on 11 February that year with the song, in a bid to represent Sweden in Eurovision Song Contest 2012 in Baku, Azerbaijan. The song finished third overall after Loreen won with "Euphoria" and Danny Saucedo was runner-up with "Amazing".

Charts

Weekly charts

Year-end charts

References

2012 singles
Ulrik Munther songs
Melodifestivalen songs of 2012
Songs written by Johan Åberg
2012 songs
Universal Music Group singles